HCSS may refer to:

Holy Cross Secondary School (Peterborough), Ontario
Hypercompact stellar system, stars around a supermassive black hole
Hardcore Superstar, Swedish rock band
HCSS (album), by Hardcore Superstar